Merluccius gayi is a  merluccid hake of the genus Merluccius, with two subspecies, the South Pacific hake or Chilean common hake (M. g. gayi) and the Peruvian hake (M. g. peruanus), found in the south-western Pacific Ocean, along the coast of South America, from Peru (Merluccius gayi peruanus) to the Chilean coasts north to the Chiloé Archipelago. During the Southern Hemisphere summer, it migrates southwards in shallow waters, while in the winter, it lives more to the north, in far deeper waters.

M. gayi is very similar to the European hake (Merluccius merluccius). They feed on crustaceans, cephalopods, and other fish.

References

External links

Merluccius
Fish of the Pacific Ocean
Fauna of Peru
Fauna of Chile
Fish described in 1848